Maximiliano Sosa (born 24 March 1988) is an Argentine professional footballer who plays as a midfielder for Deportivo Español.

Career
Sosa began his career in Buenos Aires with Defensores de Belgrano, appearing twenty-one times across three years from 2006 in Primera B Metropolitana. Between 2010 and 2011, Sosa featured seven times for Uruguayan Segunda División side Plaza Colonia. Sosa returned to his homeland in 2011, signing for Sarmiento of Torneo Argentino B. After eighteen appearances for his hometown team, the midfielder spent the 2012–13 campaign in the third tier with Colegiales. Primera C Metropolitana's Deportivo Español signed Sosa in July 2013. Four goals in thirty-eight followed, as 2013–14 ended with promotion.

After appearing one hundred and thirteen times and netting four goals in five seasons with Deportivo Español, Sosa departed in July 2017 to UAI Urquiza. Eight appearances followed, prior to Sosa completing a return to Deportivo Español on 30 June 2018. His second debut for them arrived in August during a one-goal home defeat to Talleres, on the way to fifteen further matches as they suffered relegation.

Career statistics
.

References

External links

1988 births
Living people
People from Resistencia, Chaco
Argentine footballers
Association football midfielders
Argentine expatriate footballers
Expatriate footballers in Uruguay
Argentine expatriate sportspeople in Uruguay
Primera B Metropolitana players
Uruguayan Segunda División players
Torneo Argentino B players
Primera C Metropolitana players
Defensores de Belgrano footballers
Plaza Colonia players
Sarmiento de Resistencia footballers
Club Atlético Colegiales (Argentina) players
Deportivo Español footballers
UAI Urquiza players
Sportspeople from Chaco Province